Music Colleges were introduced in 2004 as part of the Specialist Schools Programme in England. The system enables secondary schools to specialise in certain fields, in this case, music. Schools that successfully applied to the Specialist Schools Trust and became Music Colleges would receive extra funding from this joint private sector and government scheme. Music Colleges act as a local point of reference for other schools and businesses in the area, with an emphasis on promoting music within the community. Since the 2011 discontinuation of the Specialist Programme, schools must become an academy or manage a Dedicated Schools Grant if they wish to become a Music College.

In Russia, the words “music college” were incorporated into the titles of some educational institutions earlier called “specialized music schools” for gifted children. Such schools were established in the USSR by the major conservatories (entrance at the age 6–7, study duration 10–11 years) and exist also now. Among the renamed establishments, there is, e.g. the Ural Music College in Ekaterinburg. (This often causes confusions as, first, the term “college” is also used for some four-year Russian schools for people aged 15–20, and, secondly, none of the Russian meanings of the term “music college” corresponds to what is meant under “music college” in the USA).

References 

Department for Education and Skills

2004 in education
2004 introductions
Music education in the United Kingdom
Specialist schools programme